HD 20782 is a 7th magnitude G-type main sequence star 117.5 light-years away from Earth, in the constellation of Fornax. HD 20782 is a part of a wide binary system in which the other star is designated HD 20781, and both stars host planetary systems. Indeed, this is the first known case of a binary star system where there are planetary systems around both the primary and the secondary stars in the system.  The companion star HD 20781 has a very large angular separation of 252 arcsec, corresponding to 9080 AU at the distance of HD 20782. It is estimated to be 7.1 (± 4) billion years old, with a mass close to that of the Sun. (Note that, despite the numbering, HD 20782 is the primary star of the system, and HD 20781 the secondary star.)

An extremely eccentric extrasolar planet was announced around HD 20782 in 2006. In 2009 this planet's orbit was narrowed down, and it was found to have the highest eccentricity of all known exoplanets; this distinction has stood since 2012.

In 2011, two Neptune-mass planets were announced around the nearby HD 20781, and initially they too were believed to be in eccentric orbits, but less so. However, later more detailed observations on this system revealed not only two more possible planets but also that all the planets in this system, in stark contrast to HD 20782, were likely in low eccentricity orbits.

Planetary system

See also
 Struve 1341
 Kepler-16
 List of extrasolar planets

References

External links
 

Fornax (constellation)
G-type main-sequence stars
020782
015527
Planetary systems with one confirmed planet
2
Durchmusterung objects